David Benjamin Levy is a musicologist.

He is a music professor at Wake Forest University. He is a visiting professor of musicology at the Eastman School of Music. He is especially distinguished as a Beethoven scholar, but he also deals generally with the classical and romantic periods.

Bibliography

References

External links
 Book page with biography

American musicologists
Living people
Year of birth missing (living people)
Wake Forest University faculty